The Unorganized Borough is composed of the portions of the U.S. state of Alaska which are not contained in any of its 19 organized boroughs. While referred to as the "Unorganized Borough," it is not a borough itself, as it forgoes that level of government structure. It encompasses nearly half of Alaska's land area, an area larger than any other U.S. state, and larger than the land area of the smallest 16 states combined. As of the 2020 U.S. Census, it had a population of 77,157, which was 10.52% of the population of the state. The largest communities in the Unorganized Borough are the cities of Bethel, Unalaska, and Valdez.

Overview
This vast area has no local government other than that of school districts and municipalities within its limits. Many of the villages do have tribal governments, however. Except within some incorporated cities, all government services in the Unorganized Borough, including law enforcement, are provided by the state or by a tribal government. School districts in the Unorganized Borough are operated either by cities, in those limited instances when the city has chosen to undertake those powers, or through the general guidance of the state Department of Education under the auspices of Rural Education Attendance Areas.

Census areas
Unique among the United States, Alaska is not entirely subdivided into organized county equivalents. To facilitate census-taking in the vast unorganized area, the United States Census Bureau, in cooperation with the state, divided the unorganized borough into 11 census areas, beginning with the 1970 Census and undergoing border or name adjustments most recently in 2007, 2008, 2013, 2015, and 2019.

|}

History
During the 1950s, when the push for the territory of Alaska to become a state was at its height, any municipal government was extremely limited and scattered. Territory-wide, there were no more than a few dozen incorporated cities, and a small handful of service districts, broken into public utility districts and independent school districts. The service districts were authorized by the territorial legislature in 1935 to allow unincorporated areas limited powers to provide services and to raise taxes for them.

The United States Congress had forbidden the territory from establishing counties. The delegates of the convention which wrote the Alaska Constitution had, in fact, debated the merits of establishing counties, and had rejected the idea in favor of creating a system of boroughs, both organized and unorganized.

The intent of the framers of the constitution was to provide for maximum local self-government with a minimum of local government units and tax-levying jurisdictions. The minutes of the constitutional convention indicate that counties were not used as a form of local government for various reasons. The failure of some local economies to generate enough revenue to support separate counties was an important issue, as was the desire to use a model that would reflect the unique character of Alaska, provide for maximum local input, and avoid a body of county case law already in existence.

Instead, Alaska adopted boroughs as a form of regional government. This regionalization tried to avoid having a number of independent, limited-purpose governments with confusing boundaries and inefficient governmental operations. The territorial service districts had amounted to this much, but were seen by many as an important foundation for the government to provide services without becoming all-powerful and unnecessarily intrusive, an argument which surfaced time and time again during various attempts by the legislature to create organized boroughs out of portions of the unorganized borough.

Alaska adopted the borough structure by statute in 1961, and envisioned boroughs to serve as an "all-purpose" form of local government, to avoid the perceived problems of county government in the lower 48 states as well as Hawaii. According to Article X of the Alaska Constitution, areas of the state unable to support borough government were to be served by several unorganized boroughs, which were to be mechanisms for the state to regionalize services; however, separate unorganized boroughs were never created. The entire state was defined as one vast unorganized borough by the Borough Act of 1961, and over the ensuing years, Alaska's organized boroughs were carved out of it.

Alaska's first organized borough, and the only one incorporated immediately after passage of the 1961 legislation, was the Bristol Bay Borough. The pressure from residents of other areas of the state to form boroughs led to the Mandatory Borough Act of 1963, which called for all election districts in the state over a certain minimum population to incorporate as boroughs by January 1, 1964.

A resolution of the State of Alaska's Local Boundary Commission introduced in January 2009 spells this out in greater detail:

''WHEREAS, the 1963 Alaska State Legislature passed, and Governor Egan signed into law, the "Mandatory Borough Act" (Chapter 52, SLA 1963), dictating that certain regions of Alaska - those encompassing Ketchikan, Juneau, Sitka, Kodiak Island, Kenai Peninsula, Anchorage, the Matanuska-Susitna valleys, and Fairbanks - form organized boroughs by January 1, 1964.

Furthermore, 21 Rural Education Attendance Areas were established by the Legislature in 1975. This created regional divisions of the unorganized borough for the purpose of establishing rural school districts. Many REAAs were later absorbed into organized boroughs.

Regional Educational Attendance Areas
There are 19 Regional Educational Attendance Areas in the unorganized borough.

Dispute over future mandatory boroughs

A number of boroughs have been incorporated since the Mandatory Borough Act, but most (the primary examples being North Slope, Northwest Arctic, and Denali) were incorporated to exploit a significant potential source of taxation, such as natural resource extraction and tourism.

Many residents of the Unorganized Borough, particularly those in the larger communities which may be most susceptible to organized borough incorporation, have been opposed to such incorporation, and say the status quo suits them just fine.

On the other hand, many Alaskans residing in organized boroughs feel that they unfairly subsidize residents of the Unorganized Borough, especially for education. In 2003, the Alaska Division of Community Advocacy identified eight areas within the Unorganized Borough meeting standards for incorporation. Bills have been introduced in the Alaska Legislature to compel these areas to incorporate, though , none have been signed into law.

Major communities

Bethel (the largest city in the Unorganized Borough)
Cordova
Craig
Delta Junction
Deltana
Dillingham
Edna Bay
Fort Yukon
Hooper Bay
Metlakatla
Nenana
Nome
Tok
Unalaska
Valdez

See also

 Unorganized Yukon, a similar area in the neighboring Canadian territory of Yukon

References

External links

Legislative Directive for Unorganized Borough Review
Map of proposed model borough boundaries Alaska Department of Commerce, Community and Economic Development (1997)

 
Alaska boroughs